Stan Bastian is a former American educator and politician from Idaho. Bastian is a former Republican member of Idaho House of Representatives.

Early life 
Bastian was born May 3, 1941 in Bicknell, Utah.

Education 
In 1966, Bastian earned a Bachelor of Arts degree in Political Science from Sonoma State University in California. In 1971, Bastian earned a Master of Arts degree in Political Science from Colorado State University. In 1996, Bastian earned a specialist degree an Education Administration program from University of Idaho in Moscow, Idaho.

Career 
In 1967, Bastian became a school teacher, until 1996. In 1996, Bastian became a school administrator and assistant principal at Nampa Senior High School and then Skyview High School in Idaho, until 2002. In 2002, Bastian became a Professional Technical Education Coordinator at the Nampa School District in Idaho.

In 1992, Bastian became a city councilman of Eagle, Idaho, until 2006.

On November 2, 2004, Bastian won the election and became a Republican member of Idaho House of Representatives for District 14, seat B. Bastian defeated Del Bunce with 69.5% of the votes.

On November 7, 2006, Bastian won the election and became a Republican Idaho Senator for District 14. Bastian defeated Glida Bothwell with 67.59% of the votes.

Awards 
 2018 Albert Nelson Marquis Lifetime Achievement Award

Personal life 
Bastian's wife is Kathleen Bastian. They have five children. Bastian and his family lived in Eagle, Idaho.

References

External links 
 Stan Bastian at ballotpedia.org

1941 births
American educators
Republican Party Idaho state senators
Living people
Republican Party members of the Idaho House of Representatives